James H. Brown (1826–1905) was an officer in the United States Navy who served as quartermaster aboard the  during the American Civil War. He received his nation's highest award for bravery during combat, the U.S. Medal of Honor, for his actions aboard ship during the Union Navy's May 4, 1863 attack on Fort DeRussy in an attempt to disrupt the hold by Confederates over the Red River region of Louisiana. That award was conferred on April 16, 1864.

Formative years
Brown was born in Rochester, New York, in 1826.

Civil War
 Brown enlisted in the U.S. Navy during the American Civil War. In 1863, he was serving as quartermaster aboard the 378-ton, screw-propelled wooden gunboat  during the U.S. Navy's attack on Fort DeRussy, Louisiana on May 4. Despite sustaining heavy enemy fire that day, which included the projection of a ball from a 32-pound cannon through the wheelhouse of the Albatross which blew off the ship's wheel and exposed the ship's relieving tackles, the ship's officers and enlisted men were still able to capture the fort's heavy works and inflict serious damage on two Confederate steamships, the CSS Grand Duke and Mary T. For his efforts that day, which involved operating the relieving tackles under withering fire in order to move his ship out of harm's way, Brown was later awarded the U.S. Medal of Honor. The award of Brown's Medal of Honor was announced via General Order No. 32 on April 16, 1864:

Awarding medals of honor to—
J. K. L. Duncan, orindary seaman, Fort Hindman.
 Hugh Melloy, orindary seaman, Fort Hindman.
 Wm. P. Johnson, landsman, Fort Hindman.
 Bartlett Laffey, seaman, Petrel.
 Jas. Stoddard, seaman, Marmora.
 Wm. J. Franks, seaman, Marmora.
 Richard Seward, paymaster's steward, Commodore.
 Christopher Nugent, orderly sargeant Marines, Fort Henry.
 James Brown, quartermaster, Albatross.
 William Moore, boatswain's mate, Benton.
 William P. Brownell, cockswain, Benton.
 John Jackson, ordinary seaman, C. P. Williams (*Awarded under an erroneous report—not entitled to it)
 William Talbot, captain forecastle, Louisville.
 Richard Stout, landsman, Isaac Smith.
 Geo W. Leland, gunner's mate, Lehigh.
 Thos. Irving, cockswain, Lehigh.
 Horatio N. Young, seaman, Lehigh.
 William William, landsman, Lehigh.
 Frank S. Gile, landsman, Lehigh.
 Michael Huskey, fireman, Carondelet.
 John Dorman, seaman, Carondelet.
 William Farley, boatswain's mate, Marblehead.
 Chas. Moore, landsman, Marblehead.
 James Miller, quartermaster, Marblehead.
 Robert Blake (colored), powder boy, Marblehead.

Medal of Honor citation

See also

List of American Civil War Medal of Honor recipients: A–F
 Union Navy
 USS Albatross

External links
 "James H. Brown" (memorial and gravesite information). Salt Lake City, Utah: Find A Grave, retrieved online August 21, 2018.
 "USS Albatross (1861–1865)", in "Online Library of Selected Images: U.S. Navy Ships". Washington, D.C.: Naval Historical Center, U.S. Department of the Navy, retrieved online August 21, 2018.

References

1826 births
1905 deaths
People of New York (state) in the American Civil War
Union Navy officers
United States Navy Medal of Honor recipients
American Civil War recipients of the Medal of Honor